Priemer is a surname. Notable people with the surname include:

Manuela Priemer (born 1978), German hammer thrower
Petra Priemer (born 1961), German swimmer

See also
Priefer
Primmer